Liu Feng (born 1 March 1987) is a Chinese male shot putter who won two individual gold medal at the Youth World Championships.

References

External links

1987 births
Living people
Chinese male shot putters
21st-century Chinese people